Xiangshan Global Studios is a film and television studio in Xinqiao Town of Xiangshan County, Zhejiang, China. The  studio was established in 2003 and opened to the public in 2005. It was rated an AAAA-level tourist site by the China National Tourism Administration on November 7, 2012.

History
In May 2003, to shoot the wuxia television series The Return of the Condor Heroes, Zhang Jizhong invested in the construction of the Condor Heroes Town.

In 2009, the Town of Spring-autumn and Warring States Period was added to the area.

In June 2012, the Town of Republic of China was carried out.

In 2017, the Town of Tang dynasty was completed.

Notable films and TV series

Films and TV series made at the studio include:

Film

Television

References

External links
  

Buildings and structures in Ningbo
Chinese film studios
Culture in Zhejiang